Mill Point is an unincorporated community in Pocahontas County, West Virginia, United States.

Mill Point was so named on account of there being several mills near the original town site.

Notable person 
 William Luther Pierce, white supremacist, nationalist and writer of The Turner Diaries.

References

External links
 Traveling 219: Mill Point

Unincorporated communities in Pocahontas County, West Virginia
Unincorporated communities in West Virginia